= Zartech Farms =

Nigerian poultry farm

Zartech Farms (established 1983) is a large farm based in Ibadan, Nigeria, which specializes in poultry farming and meat processing production.

== History ==
In 1983, Raymond Assad Zard started the poultry business in the city of his birth after his father's successful business as a cocoa merchant.

Zartech belongs to the ZARD group of companies which also operates Kopek Construction Limited, Vina International Limited, Ibadan International School, and Sweetco Foods Limited.
